Wondertown may refer to:

A town from the 1991 Cuban film Alice in Wondertown
A track from the New West Motel album by  alternative rock band The Walkabouts
A comics series by Fabien Vehlmann